Thanapathilage Gedara (Ambassador's House) is a 2007 Sri Lankan Sinhala comedy film directed by Nalin Mapitiya and co-produced by Dr. Arosha Fernando for Universal Media with Haniff Yusoof for ExpoLanka group. It stars Sriyantha Mendis and Buddhadasa Vithanarachchi in lead roles along with Roshan Pilapitiya and Saranga Disasekara. Music composed by Darshana Ruwan Dissanayake.

Plot

Cast
 Sriyantha Mendis		
 Palitha Silva		
 Saranga Disasekara		
 Buddhadasa Vithanarachchi		
 Roshan Pilapitiya		
 Janak Premalal		
 Janaka Kumbukage		
 Gangu Roshana		
 Roshan Ravindra		
 Himali Siriwardena		
 Sachini Ayendra		
 Umali Thilakarathne		
 Surya Dayaruwan		
 Dilhani Ekanayake		
 Cletus Mendis		
 Bimal Jayakody		
 Giriraj Kaushalya	
 Rathna Lalani Jayakody
 Kamal Deshapriya
 Sampath Tennakoon
 Prasannajith Abeysuriya
 Chinthaka Kulathunga		
 Dimuthu Chinthaka		
 Wasantha Wittachchi
 Richard Manamudali
 Ruwan Wickramasinghe
 Kumudu Nishantha
 Wilman Sirimanne

References

External links
 

2000s Sinhala-language films
2007 films
2007 comedy films
Sri Lankan comedy films